The following is a list of bands described as playing melodic metalcore, a genre of music combining metalcore with melodic death metal.

List of bands
36 Crazyfists
7 Angels 7 Plagues
A Day to Remember
The Agonist
All That Remains
The Amity Affliction
As Blood Runs Black
As I Lay Dying
Atreyu
August Burns Red
Avenged Sevenfold
Bleed from Within
Bleeding Through
Bring Me the Horizon
Bullet for My Valentine
Bury Tomorrow
Caliban
Cataract
Darkest Hour
Dead to Fall
Electric Callboy
Feed Her to the Sharks
Heaven Shall Burn
Ice Nine Kills
I Killed the Prom Queen
In This Moment
Killswitch Engage
Misery Signals
Miss May I
Mutiny Within
Of Mice & Men
Parkway Drive
Phinehas
Poison the Well
Shadows Fall
Shai Hulud
Trivium
Unearth
The Raven Age
Wage War

See also
List of metalcore bands
List of melodic death metal bands

References

Metalcore
Lists of metalcore bands